Mary's tears or Our Lady's tears may refer to:
 Pulmonaria officinalis or lungwort
 Lily of the valley or Convallaria majalis